John Longmuir is a Scottish-born Australian tenor. Known primarily for operatic roles he is also in demand on the concert platform and has appeared as a judge on channel seven's music competition show 'All Together Now'. Noted for his "generous voice, bright ringing vocal quality and legato phrasing" His operatic studies took place at the Australian Opera Studio.  In 2019 John received his first Helpmann Award nomination, for his role as the Captain in Berg's Wozzeck, for Opera Australia.

Career 
Longmuir's professional concert debut was in Gabriel Fauré's La naissance de Venus at the Konzerthaus Berlin, with the Berliner Cappella. The same year he made his professional operatic debut, in Tokyo, Japan, as Ismaele in Verdi's Nabucco.

The following year he debuted for Opera Australia at the Sydney Opera House as Almaviva in The Barber of Seville. This began his association with Opera Australia, first as a young artist, then as a principal. Since joining the company, Longmuir has sung over 400 performances across 25 roles.

Singing a wide range of repertoire, he appears frequently with Australia's major orchestras and opera companies including: Sydney Symphony Orchestra, Melbourne Symphony Orchestra, West Australian Symphony Orchestra, Queensland Symphony Orchestra, West Australian Opera, State Opera of South Australia and Sydney Philharmonia.

Roles 
Roles performed for Opera Australia:

 Don Ottavio in Don Giovanni (Mozart)
 Almaviva in The Barber of Seville (Rossini)
 Ernesto in Don Pasquale (Donizetti)
 Tamino in The Magic Flute (Mozart)
 Fenton in Falstaff (Verdi)
 The Colonel in Ghost Sonata 
 Narciso in Il turco in Italia (Rossini)
 Pong in Turandot (Puccini)
 Beppe in Pagliacci (Leoncavallo)
 Camille in The Merry Widow (Lehar)
 Arturo in Lucia di Lammermoor (Donizetti)
 Emilio in Partenope (Handel)
 Italian Tenor in Capriccio (Strauss)
Juan in Don Quichotte (Massenet) 
Gastone in La Traviata (Verdi)
Messenger in Aida (Verdi)
Count of Lerma in Don Carlos (Verdi)
Ballad Singer in Of mice and Men (Floyd)
Mayor Upfold in Albert Herring (Britten)
 Snout in A Midsummer night's Dream (Britten)
Kunz Vogelgesang in Der Meistersinger von Nurnberg (Wagner)
Der Hauptmann in Wozzeck (Berg)
Don Luigino in Il Viaggio a Reims (Rossini)
Sir Hervey in Anna Bolena (Donizetti)
Soloist in The Diary of One Who Vanished (Janacek)

Other operatic roles include:

 Rinuccio in Gianni Schicchi (Puccini)
 Brighella in Ariadne auf Naxos (Strauss)
 Arbace in Idomeneo (Mozart)
 Grimoaldo in Rodelinda (Handel)
 Ismaele in Nabucco (Verdi)
 Tapioca in L'etoile (Chabrier)
 Die Knusperhexe in Hansel und Gretel (Humperdinck)
Rev. Horace Adams in Peter Grimes (Britten)
Mavra in Mavra (Stravinsky)

Works performed in concert:

 Tenor Soloist in Messiah (Handel)
 Tenor Soloist in Israel in Egypt (Handel)
 Obadiah in Elijah (Mendelssohn)
 Tenor Soloist in Carmina Burana (Orff)
 Tenor Soloist in Stabat Mater (Rossini)
 Belshazzar in Belshazzar (Handel)
 Tenor Soloist in Requiem in D minor (Mozart)
 Tenor Soloist in B Minor Mass (Bach)
 Tenor Soloist in C Minor Mass (Mozart)

Recognition and Awards 

 Winner of the 85th Herald Sun Aria competition 2009
Winner of the Sydney Eisteddfod's Opera and Arts Support Scholarship 2009
Inaugural winner of the Joan Sutherland and Richard Bonynge bel canto award] 2011
Nominated in both the 'Best actor in an Opera' (Camille in Merry Widow) and 'Best supporting actor in an Opera' (Gastone in la Traviata & Arturo in Lucia di Lammermoor) categories in the BroadwayWorld Australia - Sydney Awards 2018
Nominated in the 'Best Male Performer in a Supporting Role in Opera' (The Captain in Wozzeck for Opera Australia) in the 19th Annual Helpmann Awards 2019
Nominated in both the 'Best actor in an Opera' (Nominated twice for Ghost Sonata and Wozzeck) and 'Best supporting actor in an Opera' (Nominated three times for Anna Bolena, Turandot and Peter Grimes) categories in the BroadwayWorld Australia - Sydney Awards 2019

Television, radio broadcast and recordings

Television credits 
 Appeared as a judge on the Seven network's musical competition program All Together Now which aired in 2018.
Advertisements for Leggos and Dry July
 Appearances on the Seven Network's The Morning Show and Telethon

Radio broadcasts 
All recorded and broadcast with The Australian Broadcasting Corporation:

Stabat Mater (Rossini) with West Australian Symphony Orchestra
Of Mice and Men (C. Flloyd) with Opera Australia
Capriccio (R. Strauss) with Opera Australia
B minor mass (Bach) with Queensland Symphony Orchestra
Don Carlos (Verdi) with Opera Australia
Albert Herring (Britten) with Opera Australia
La Traviata (Verdi) with Opera Australia
Don Quichotte (Massenet) with Opera Australia
Lucia di Lammermoor (Donizetti) with Opera Australia
Die Meistersinger von Nurnberg (Wagner) with Opera Australia
Wozzeck (Berg) with Opera Australia
Anna Bolena (Donizetti) with Opera Australia
Peter Grimes (Britten) with Sydney Symphony Orchestra
Turandot (Puccini) with Opera Australia
Ghost Sonata (Reimann) with Opera Australia

Commercial recordings 
Rodelinda (Handel) conducted by Richard Bonynge (Australian Broadcasting Corporation); also appears in Richard Bonynge, The Opera Collection.
Turandot (Puccini) (Australian Broadcasting Corporation) Also broadcast internationally in cinemas
Guest artist on It's the Heart that Matters Most, Rachael Hardie (CD) Independent label

References

External links 

Management, Patrick Togher Artists' Management
Schedule, Operabase
Reviews, BachTrack
Profile, Opera Musica
Profile, The Opera Stage
Profile, PlanetOpera.com
'John Longmuir & the bargain bin video that changed his life' for The Opera Blog
'All together now from the Opera Judges' for Limelight Magazine
'On the couch with John Longmuir' for Australian Arts Review
'Meet John Longmuir' for Melbourne Symphony Orchestra

Year of birth missing (living people)
Place of birth missing (living people)
Living people
Australian operatic tenors